Trimbleville, Pennsylvania, also known as Trimble's Ford and the Trimbleville Historic District is a hamlet of about six homes, in southern Chester County, Pennsylvania, about two miles south of Marshallton.

James Trimble first bought land in the area on the banks of the west branch of the Brandywine River in 1744, with his descendants living in the hamlet until 1948.  Several buildings survive from the eighteenth century. Buildings in the area include the Trimble's farmhouse, a mill, blacksmith and wheelwright shops, and a boarding school. The area was listed by the National Register of Historic Places as a historic district in 1985.

During the Battle of Brandywine on September 11, 1777, over 12,000 British troops under Generals William Howe and Charles Cornwallis crossed the west branch of the Brandywine at Trimble's Ford.  The troops began the flanking maneuver in Kennett Square, made their first crossing at Trimble's Ford, then crossed the east branch at Jefferis Ford, before engaging the American troops near Birmingham Friends Meetinghouse.

References

Houses on the National Register of Historic Places in Pennsylvania
Federal architecture in Pennsylvania
Colonial architecture in Pennsylvania
Historic districts in Chester County, Pennsylvania
Houses in Chester County, Pennsylvania
Historic districts on the National Register of Historic Places in Pennsylvania
National Register of Historic Places in Chester County, Pennsylvania